Cody Almond (born July 24, 1989) is a Canadian-born Swiss professional ice hockey centre for Lausanne HC of the National League (NL). He has formerly played for the Minnesota Wild in the National Hockey League (NHL).

Playing career
Almond was originally selected by the Minnesota Wild in the fifth round, 140th overall in the 2007 NHL Entry Draft from the Kelowna Rockets of the Western Hockey League. He made his NHL debut on February 12, 2010 against the Atlanta Thrashers, and scored his first goal on April 4, 2010 against the Vancouver Canucks.

Almond started the 2010–11 season with Minnesota's AHL affiliate, the Houston Aeros, but was recalled to the NHL on November 4, 2010.

On June 20, 2012, Almond left the Wild organization for Europe and was signed to a three-year contract with HC Genève-Servette of the Swiss National League A.

In his second season with Genève-Servette in 2013–14, Almond broke out offensively whilst still providing a physical two-way game in contributing with 18 goals and 34 points in 44 games.  Approaching the final year of his contract he re-signed to a five-year contract extension with Genève-Servette on June 23, 2014.

Only two weeks after in signing his extension, Almond was granted a release from the Eagles, after earning a one-year, $550,000 contract to return with the Wild on July 8, 2014. Almond was unable to make the Wild's opening night roster for the 2014–15 season, and was assigned to AHL affiliate, the Iowa Wild. After just five games, going scoreless, and recovering from an injury, Almond opted to leave Minnesota and return to Switzerland on his initial five-year agreement made with Genève-Servette HC on December 1, 2014.

In June 2018, Almond opted out of his contract with Genève-Servette HC to sign a three-year deal worth CHF 1.6 million (+ bonuses and additional costs) with Lausanne HC for the 2019/20 season. Almond should have joined Lausanne in the summer of 2018, but both clubs failed to find an agreement, forcing  Almond to stay in Geneva through the 2018/19 season.

During his tenure with Servette, Almond was largely criticized for his inconsistency and his lack of physical condition as he failed to play a single full season over 7 years in Geneva. He eventually played 213 regular season games with Geneva (139 points) and 35 playoffs games (20 points), before moving to Geneva's biggest rival, Lausanne HC.

Personal life
Almond received Swiss citizenship in 2012. His maternal grandmother Martha is a native of Olten, Switzerland.

Career statistics

Regular season and playoffs

International

References

External links

1989 births
Living people
Canadian ice hockey centres
Genève-Servette HC players
Houston Aeros (1994–2013) players
Ice hockey people from Calgary
Iowa Wild players
Kelowna Rockets players
Lausanne HC players
Minnesota Wild draft picks
Minnesota Wild players
Ice hockey players at the 2018 Winter Olympics
Olympic ice hockey players of Switzerland
Canadian expatriate ice hockey players in Switzerland
Naturalised citizens of Switzerland
Canadian expatriate ice hockey players in the United States
Canadian emigrants to Switzerland
Swiss ice hockey centres
Swiss expatriate sportspeople in the United States